Searle may refer to:


Persons
 Searle (surname)
 J. Searle Dawley (1877–1949), American film director, producer, screenwriter, stage actor and playwright
 Searle Turton (born 1979), Canadian politician

Places
 Serle, a comune in Lombardy, Italy
 Nuvuttiq, formerly Cape Searle, an uninhabited headland in Nunavut, Canada
 Searle Pass, a mountain pass in the Gore Range of the Rocky Mountains of Colorado, United States

Other uses
 G. D. Searle & Company, a pharmaceutical corporation that also makes food additives
 Searle Scholars Program, an award sponsored by the company

See also
 Searle x Waldron, an Australian architecture firm
 Searles (disambiguation)
 Searl, a surname
 Searls, a surname